Richard James Mulcahy (10 May 1886 – 16 December 1971) was an Irish Fine Gael politician and army general who served as Minister for Education from 1948 to 1951 and 1954 to 1957, Minister for the Gaeltacht from June 1956 to October 1956, Leader of the Opposition from 1944 to 1948, Leader of Fine Gael from 1944 to 1959, Minister for Local Government and Public Health from 1927 to 1932 and Minister for Defence from January to April 1919 and 1922 to 1924. He served as a Teachta Dála (TD) from 1918 to 1938 and from 1943 to 1961 and a Senator from March 1938 to June 1938 and 1943 to 1944.

He was an army general and commander-in-chief of the Irish Republican Army. He fought in the 1916 Easter Rising, served as Chief of Staff of the Irish Republican Army during the War of Independence and became commander of the pro-treaty forces in the Irish Civil War after the death of Michael Collins. He later served in the cabinets of W. T. Cosgrave and John A. Costello.

Early life and 1916 Rising
Richard Mulcahy was born in Manor Street, Waterford, in 1886, the son of post office clerk Patrick Mulcahy and Elizabeth Slattery. He was educated at Mount Sion Christian Brothers School and later in Thurles, County Tipperary, where his father was the postmaster. One of his grandmothers was a Quaker who was disowned by her wealthy family for marrying a Catholic. 

Mulcahy joined the Royal Mail (Post Office Engineering Dept.) in 1902, and worked in Thurles, Bantry, Wexford and Dublin. He was a member of the Gaelic League and joined the Irish Volunteers at the time of their formation in 1913. He was also a member of the Irish Republican Brotherhood.

He was second-in-command to Thomas Ashe (who later died on hunger strike) in an encounter with the armed Royal Irish Constabulary (RIC) at Ashbourne, County Meath during the Easter Rising in 1916—one of the few stand-out victories won by republicans in that week, and generally credited to Mulcahy's grasp of tactics. In his book on the Rising, Charles Townshend principally credits Mulcahy with the defeat of the RIC at Ashbourne, for conceiving and leading a flanking movement on the RIC column that had engaged with the Irish Volunteers. Arrested after the Rising, Mulcahy was interned at Knutsford and at the Frongoch internment camp in Wales until his release on 24 December 1916.

War of Independence and Civil War

On his release, Mulcahy immediately rejoined the republican movement and became commandant of the Dublin Brigade of the Irish Volunteers. He was elected to the First Dáil in the 1918 general election for Dublin Clontarf. He was then named Minister for Defence in the new (alternative) government and later Assistant Minister for Defence. In March 1918, he became IRA chief of staff, a position he held until January 1922.

He and Michael Collins were largely responsible for directing the military campaign against the British during the War of Independence. During this period of upheaval in 1919, he married Mary Josephine (Min) Ryan, sister of Kate and Phyllis Ryan, the successive wives of Seán T. O'Kelly; her brother was James Ryan. O'Kelly and James Ryan both later served in Fianna Fáil governments.

Mulcahy supported the Anglo-Irish Treaty of December 1921.  Archive film shows that Mulcahy, as Minister of Defence, was the Irish officer who raised the Irish tricolour at the first hand-over of a British barracks to the National Army in January 1922. He was defence minister in Provisional Government on its creation and succeeded Collins, after the latter's assassination, as Commander-in-Chief of the Provisional Government's forces, during the subsequent Civil War.

He earned notoriety through his order that anti-Treaty activists captured carrying arms were liable for execution. A total of 77 anti-Treaty prisoners were executed by the Provisional Government. Mulcahy served as Minister for Defence in the new Free State government from January 1924 until March 1924, but resigned in protest because of the sacking of the Army Council after criticism by the Executive Council over the handling of the 'Army Mutiny', when some National Army War of Independence officers almost revolted after Mulcahy demobilised many of them at the end of the Civil War. He re-entered the cabinet as Minister for Local Government and Public Health in 1927.

Post-independence politician
During his period on the backbenches of Dáil Éireann his electoral record fluctuated. He was elected as TD for Dublin North-West at the 1921 and 1922 general elections. He moved to Dublin North for the election the following year, and was re-elected there in four further elections: June 1927, September 1927, 1932 and 1933.

Dublin North was abolished for the 1937 election, at which Mulcahy was defeated in the new constituency of Dublin North-East. However, he secured election to Seanad Éireann as a Senator, the upper house of the Oireachtas, representing the Administrative Panel. The 2nd Seanad sat for less than two months, and at the 1938 general election he was elected to the 10th Dáil as a TD for Dublin North-East. Defeated again in the election of 1943, he secured election to the 4th Seanad by the Labour Panel.

Leader of Fine Gael

After the resignation of W. T. Cosgrave as Leader of Fine Gael in 1944, Mulcahy became party leader while still a member of the Seanad. Thomas F. O'Higgins was parliamentary leader of the party in the Dáil at the time and Leader of the Opposition. Facing his first general election as party leader, Mulcahy drew up a list of 13 young candidates to contest seats for Fine Gael. Of the eight who ran, four were elected. He had successfully cast aside the Cosgrave legacy of antipathy to constituency work, travelling the country on an autocycle and bringing new blood into the party. He was returned again to the 12th Dáil as a TD for Tipperary at the 1944 general election. While Fine Gael's decline had been slowed, its future was still in doubt.

Following the 1948 general election—at which, following boundary changes, Mulcahy was elected for Tipperary South, the dominant Fianna Fáil party finished six seats short of a majority. However, it was 37 seats ahead of Fine Gael, and conventional wisdom suggested that Fianna Fáil was the only party that could possibly form a government. Just as negotiations got underway, however, Mulcahy realised that if Fine Gael, the Labour Party, the National Labour Party, Clann na Poblachta and Clann na Talmhan banded together, they would have only one seat fewer than Fianna Fáil—and that if they could get support from seven independents, they would be able to form a government. He played a leading role in persuading the other parties to put aside their differences and join forces to consign the then Taoiseach and Fianna Fáil leader Éamon de Valera, to the opposition benches.

Since Fine Gael was by far the largest party in the prospective coalition, Mulcahy initially seemed set to become Taoiseach in a coalition government. However, he was not acceptable to Clann na Poblachta's leader, Seán MacBride. Many Irish republicans had never forgiven Mulcahy for his role in the Civil War executions carried out under the Cosgrave government in the 1920s. Consequently, MacBride let it be known that he and his party would not serve under Mulcahy. Without Clann na Poblachta, the other parties would have had 57 seats between them—17 seats short of a majority in the 147-seat Dáil. According to Mulcahy, the suggestion that another person serve as Taoiseach came from Labour leader William Norton. Mulcahy stepped aside and encouraged his party colleague John A. Costello, a former Attorney General, to become the parliamentary leader of Fine Gael and the coalition's candidate for Taoiseach. For the next decade, Costello served as the party's parliamentary leader while Mulcahy remained the nominal leader of the party.

Mulcahy went on to serve as Minister for Education under Costello from 1948 until 1951. Another coalition government came to power at the 1954 election, with Mulcahy once again stepping aside to become Minister for Education in the Second Inter-Party Government. The government fell in 1957, but Mulcahy remained as Fine Gael leader until October 1959. In October the following year, he told his Tipperary constituents that he did not intend to contest the next election.

Family
Richard Mulcahy married Min Ryan, the former fiancée of Seán Mac Diarmada, in 1920, and lived in a flat in Oakley House, Ranelagh. Min, a member of the Cumann na mBan Executive, had herself been involved in nationalist activity at the time of the Rising. One of his sons, Risteárd Mulcahy, was for many years a cardiologist in Dublin. His daughter Neillí Mulcahy (1925–2012) was one of Ireland's leading fashion designers. She designed the uniforms for Aer Lingus in 1962. Another son was the structural engineer and visual artist Seán Mulcahy (1926–2018).

Richard Mulcahy died from natural causes in Dublin on 16 December 1971, at the age of 85.

See also

List of members of the Oireachtas imprisoned during the Irish revolutionary period

References

Bibliography
 'Portrait of a Revolutionary: General Richard Mulcahy and the Founding of the Irish Free State' by Maryann Gialanella Valiulis
'My Father, the General: Richard Mulcahy and the Military History of the Revolution' by Risteárd Mulcahy

External links
 

1886 births
1971 deaths
Politicians from County Waterford
Early Sinn Féin TDs
Cumann na nGaedheal TDs
Leaders of Fine Gael
National Army (Ireland) generals
Irish Republican Army (1919–1922) members
People of the Irish Civil War (Pro-Treaty side)
Members of the 1st Dáil
Members of the 2nd Dáil
Members of the 3rd Dáil
Members of the 4th Dáil
Members of the 5th Dáil
Members of the 6th Dáil
Members of the 7th Dáil
Members of the 8th Dáil
Members of the 10th Dáil
Members of the 12th Dáil
Members of the 13th Dáil
Members of the 14th Dáil
Members of the 15th Dáil
Members of the 16th Dáil
Members of the 2nd Seanad
Members of the 4th Seanad
Members of the Irish Republican Brotherhood
Members of the Parliament of the United Kingdom for County Dublin constituencies (1801–1922)
UK MPs 1918–1922
Presidential appointees to the Council of State (Ireland)
Ministers for Health (Ireland)
Ministers for Defence (Ireland)
Ministers for Education (Ireland)
Chiefs of Staff of the Defence Forces (Ireland)
Fine Gael TDs
Fine Gael senators
Military personnel from County Waterford